The Maltese Falcon is a 1941 American film noir written and directed by John Huston in his directorial debut, based on the 1930 novel of the same name by Dashiell Hammett and indebted to the 1931 movie of the same name. It stars Humphrey Bogart as private investigator Sam Spade and Mary Astor as his femme fatale client. Gladys George, Peter Lorre and Sydney Greenstreet co-star, with the last appearing in his film debut. The story follows a San Francisco private detective and his dealings with three unscrupulous adventurers, all of whom are competing to obtain a jewel-encrusted falcon statuette.

The film premiered in New York City on October 3, 1941, and was nominated for three Academy Awards. Considered one of the greatest films of all time, it was one of the first 25 films selected by the Library of Congress to be included in the National Film Registry for being "culturally, historically, or aesthetically significant". It is a part of Roger Ebert's series The Great Movies and was cited by Panorama du Film Noir Américain as the first major film noir.

Plot

In San Francisco in 1941, private investigators Sam Spade and Miles Archer meet prospective client Ruth Wonderly. She claims to be looking for her missing sister, who ran off from their home in New York and came to the city with a man named Floyd Thursby. Archer agrees to help get her sister back. However, later that night, the police inform Spade that Archer has been killed. Spade tries calling his client at her hotel to discover she has checked out. Back at his apartment, he is grilled by Police Detective Tom Polhaus and Lieutenant Dundy, who tell him that Thursby was murdered the same evening. Dundy suggests that Spade had the opportunity and motive to kill Thursby, who likely killed Archer.

Later that morning, Spade meets Wonderly, now calling herself Brigid O'Shaughnessy, who confesses that her story was made up. However, she convinces Spade to investigate the murders and also reveals that Thursby was her partner. He took advantage of her and probably killed Archer, but she claims to have no idea who killed Thursby. At his office, Spade meets Joel Cairo, who first offers him $5,000 to find a "black figure of a bird". When Spade is skeptical, Cairo pulls a gun on him and searches the room for it. Spade knocks Cairo out and goes through his belongings. When Cairo comes round, he hires Spade.

On his way to visit O'Shaughnessy later that evening, Spade is followed by a young man but manages to evade him. When he tells O'Shaughnessy about Cairo, her nervousness indicates she knows him. He arranges a meeting between the two at his apartment, where Cairo becomes agitated when O'Shaughnessy reveals that the "Fat Man" is in San Francisco. When Spade goes to Cairo's hotel in the morning, he spots Wilmer Cook, the young man who trailed him earlier. Wilmer works for Kasper Gutman, the "Fat Man". In his hotel suite, Gutman relates the history of the Maltese Falcon, then offers Spade his pick of $25,000 for the bird and another $25,000 after its sale, or a quarter of the proceeds from its sale. 

Spade passes out because his drink is spiked. Wilmer and Cairo come in from another room and leave with Gutman. On coming round, Spade searches the suite and finds a newspaper with the arrival time of the freighter La Paloma circled. He goes to the dock, only to find the ship on fire. Later, the ship's captain Jacoby is shot several times and staggers into Spade's office before dying. The bundle he was clutching contains the Maltese Falcon. O'Shaughnessy calls the office, gives an address, then screams before the line goes dead.

Spade stashes the package at the bus terminal, then goes to the address, which turns out to be an empty lot. Spade returns home to discover O'Shaughnessy hiding in a doorway. He takes her inside and finds Gutman, Cairo, and Wilmer waiting for him, guns drawn. Gutman gives Spade $10,000 for the Falcon, but Spade tells them that part of his price is someone he can turn over to the police for the murders of Thursby and Captain Jacoby, suggesting Wilmer. After some intense negotiation, Gutman and Cairo agree and Wilmer is knocked out and disarmed.

Just after dawn, Spade calls his secretary, Effie Perine, to bring him the bundle. However, when Gutman inspects the statuette, he finds it is a fake and Wilmer escapes during the tumult. Recovering his composure, Gutman invites Cairo to return with him to Istanbul to continue their quest. After they leave, Spade calls the police and tells them where to pick up the pair. Spade then angrily confronts O'Shaughnessy, telling her he knows she killed Archer to implicate Thursby, her unwanted accomplice. She confesses, but begs Spade not to turn her over to the police. Despite his feelings for her, Spade gives O'Shaughnessy up, then submits the statuette as evidence, describing it as "the stuff that dreams are made of".

Cast

 Humphrey Bogart as Sam Spade
 Mary Astor as Ruth Wonderly/Brigid O'Shaughnessy
 Gladys George as Iva Archer
 Peter Lorre as Joel Cairo
 Barton MacLane as Lieutenant Dundy
 Lee Patrick as Effie Perine
 Sydney Greenstreet as Kasper Gutman
 Ward Bond as Detective Tom Polhaus
 Jerome Cowan as Miles Archer
 Elisha Cook Jr. as Wilmer Cook
 James Burke as Luke, hotel detective
 Murray Alper as Frank Richman, taxi driver
 John Hamilton as District Attorney Bryan
 Walter Huston as Captain Jacoby (uncredited)

Production

Background
Hammett had once worked as a private detective for the Pinkerton Detective Agency in San Francisco, and he used his birth name "Samuel" for the story's protagonist. He wrote of the book's main character in 1934:

Spade has no original. He is a dream man in the sense that he is what most of the private detectives I worked with would like to have been, and, in their cockier moments, thought they approached.

Other characters in The Maltese Falcon were based on people whom he met or worked with during that time. The character of sinister "Fat Man" Kasper Gutman was based on Maundy Gregory, an overweight British detective-entrepreneur who was involved in many sophisticated endeavors and capers, including a search for a long-lost treasure like the jeweled Falcon. The character of Joel Cairo was based on a criminal whom Hammett arrested for forgery in Pasco, Washington, in 1920.

The novel was serialized in five parts in Black Mask during 1929 and 1930 before being published in book form in 1930 by Alfred A. Knopf. Warner Bros. quickly bought the film rights of the novel, and made an adaptation the following year starring Ricardo Cortez and Bebe Daniels. The film closely followed the novel, including its references to homosexuality and a scene of Spade strip-searching Wonderly for a missing $1,000 bill. These topics made the film unscreenable a few years later under the Motion Picture Production Code, who refused to grant the studio a certificate when they tried to re-release it in 1935. The studio remade the story as the more Code-friendly Satan Met a Lady starring Bette Davis and Warren William. The film changed much of the novel's elements and became a comedy. However, it was panned by critics and audiences alike, including Davis, who referred to it as "junk."

Pre-production
During his preparation for The Maltese Falcon, his directorial debut, John Huston planned each second of the film to the last detail, tailoring the screenplay with instructions to himself for a shot-for-shot setup, with sketches for every scene, so filming could proceed fluently and professionally. Huston was adamant the film be methodically planned, thus ensuring the production maintained a tight schedule within their budget. It was shot quickly and completed for less than $400,000.

Such was the extent and efficacy of Huston's preparation of the script that almost no line of dialogue was eliminated in the final edit. Except for some exterior night shots, Huston shot the entire film in sequence, which greatly helped his actors. Much of the dialogue from the original novel was retained. The only major section of the novel missing in the film is the story of a man named "Flitcraft", which Spade tells to Brigid while waiting in his apartment for Cairo to arrive.

Huston removed all references to sex that the Hays Office had deemed to be unacceptable. He was also warned not to show excessive drinking. The director fought the latter, on the grounds that Spade was a man who put away a half bottle of hard liquor a day and showing him completely abstaining from alcohol would mean seriously falsifying his character.

Casting

Bogart was not the first choice to play Sam Spade; the role was originally offered to George Raft. Raft rejected the role because he did not want to work with an inexperienced director, and had a stipulation in his contract from making remakes. Raft chose instead to make director Raoul Walsh's comedy-drama Manpower with Edward G. Robinson and Marlene Dietrich, which was released to lesser success. This was one of several roles Raft turned down in movies that ended up being classics. Huston was grateful that Bogart had quickly accepted the role, and the film helped consolidate their lifelong friendship and set the stage for collaboration on other films. Bogart's convincing interpretation became the archetype for a private detective in the film noir genre, providing him acclaim and solidifying his onscreen persona. Ingrid Bergman watched Maltese Falcon over and over again while preparing for Casablanca in order to learn how to interact and act with Bogart.

Bergman, Joan Bennett, Geraldine Fitzgerald, Paulette Goddard, Janet Gaynor, Olivia de Havilland, and Loretta Young were all considered for the role of Brigid. Fitzgerald was offered the part, but turned it down. Eve Arden was considered for the role of Effie. Lee Patrick was initially considered for the role of Iva, but later received the part of Effie. Having difficulty casting Kasper Gutman, Huston screen tested stage actor Sydney Greenstreet on the suggestion of producer Hal Wallis. Greenstreet, who was 61 and weighed between 280 and 350 pounds, had not appeared on film before. However, he managed to impress Huston with his sheer size, distinctive abrasive laugh, bulbous eyes, and manner of speaking.

Filming
Principal photography took place on the Warner Bros. backlot from June 9 to July 18, 1941, with some reshoots on August 8. Following a preview screening on September 5, studio head Jack L. Warner ordered reshoots to simplify the opening scene. These reshoots took place on September 10, with Ernest Haller as cinematographer since original cinematographer Arthur Edeson was unavailable.

Cinematography
Director of Photography Arthur Edeson, who had a background that included Universal's monster films, used low-key lighting and arresting angles to emphasize the nature of the characters and their actions, such as the scene where Gutman explains the history of the Falcon to Spade, drawing out his story so that the knockout drops in Spade's drink will take effect. Roger Ebert describes this scene as "an astonishing unbroken seven-minute take", and script supervisor Meta Wilde remarked of this scene:
It was an incredible camera setup. We rehearsed two days. The camera followed Greenstreet and Bogart from one room into another, then down a long hallway and finally into a living room; there the camera moved up and down in what is referred to as a boom-up and boom-down shot, then panned from left to right and back to Bogart's drunken face; the next pan shot was to Greenstreet's massive stomach from Bogart's point of view.… One miss and we had to begin all over again.

Props

Fred Sexton, an American artist, sculpted the Maltese Falcon statuette prop for the film. The "Maltese Falcon" itself was based on the "Kniphausen Hawk", a ceremonial pouring vessel made in 1697 for Georg Wilhelm von Kniphausen, Count of the Holy Roman Empire. It is modeled after a hawk perched on a rock and is encrusted with red garnets, amethysts, emeralds, and sapphires. It is currently owned by the Cavendish family and is part of the collection at Chatsworth House.

One of the falcons was given to actor William Conrad by studio chief Jack L. Warner; it was auctioned in December 1994 for $398,500, the highest price paid for a film prop at that time. A 45-pound metal prop that appeared in the film was sold at auction on November 25, 2013, for over $4 million.

Reception

Critical

Following a preview in September 1941, Variety called it "one of the best examples of actionful and suspenseful melodramatic story telling in cinematic form":

Unfolding a most intriguing and entertaining murder mystery, picture displays outstanding excellence in writing, direction, acting and editing—combining in overall as a prize package of entertainment for widest audience appeal. Due for hefty grosses in all runs, it's textured with ingredients presaging numerous holdovers in the keys—and strong word-of-mouth will make the b.o. wickets spin.

Upon its release, Bosley Crowther described it as "the best mystery thriller of the year", saying "young Mr. Huston gives promise of becoming one of the smartest directors in the field"; according to Crowther, "the trick which Mr. Huston has pulled is a combination of American ruggedness with the suavity of the English crime school—a blend of mind and muscle—plus a slight touch of pathos". The widely read trade paper The Film Daily agreed with Crowther's assessment of the film and focused special attention as well on Huston's directorial debut. In its 1941 review of the "beautifully made" production, the paper asserted: "John Huston's direction of his own screenplay is as brilliant as any of the jewels which are alleged to encrust the falcon whose possession is the crux of the story".

As a measure of modern or more current reactions to the film, the review-aggregation website Rotten Tomatoes reports The Maltese Falcon holds an approval rating of 99% based on 106 reviews, with an average rating of 9.20/10. The site's critics consensus reads: "Suspenseful, labyrinthine, and brilliantly cast, The Maltese Falcon is one of the most influential noirs—as well as a showcase for Humphrey Bogart at his finest." On Metacritic, the film has a weighted average score of 97 out of 100, based on 15 critics, indicating "universal acclaim".

Box office
According to Warner Bros.' records the film earned $967,000 domestically and $805,000 foreign.

Awards
The film received three nominations at the 14th Academy Awards: Best Picture, Sydney Greenstreet for Best Supporting Actor, and John Huston for Best Adapted Screenplay.

Proposed sequel and adaptations
In the wake of the film's success, Warner Bros. immediately put a sequel tentatively titled The Further Adventures of the Maltese Falcon into development. Huston was set to direct the sequel, with Jack Warner approaching Dashiel Hammett to write a screenplay. However, Huston and Bogart's high demand and the studio's inability to agree on a salary with Hammett caused the plans to be dropped.

The film was adapted for radio several times. The first was for the Silver Theater broadcast on the CBS radio network on February 1, 1942, with Bogart as star. Philip Morris Playhouse staged an adaptation August 14, 1942, with Edward Arnold starring. CBS later created a 30-minute adaptation for The Screen Guild Theater with Bogart, Astor, Greenstreet and Lorre all reprising their roles. This radio segment was originally released on September 20, 1943, and was played again on July 3, 1946.

Legacy
The Maltese Falcon has been cited among some to be the first true film noir, though this is heavily debated. Nonetheless, it did have an impacting influence on the industry. Its success launched the careers of Huston, Bogart, and Greenstreet, as well as help revitalize the career of Astor. Bogart would largely portray characters like Spade for the studio in several notable films, including Casablanca (1942) and The Big Sleep (1946).

The 1975 comedy film The Black Bird directed by David Giler served as a parody sequel, starring George Segal as Sam Spade, Jr., son of the recently deceased Sam Spade forced to take over his father's agency. Lee Patrick and Elisha Cook, Jr. reprised their respective roles of Effie and Wilmer; Patrick came out of retirement for the film, which turned out to be her final acting appearance. The film was released by Columbia Pictures on May 9, 1975.

In 1989, The Maltese Falcon was selected for preservation in the United States National Film Registry by the Library of Congress as being "culturally, historically, or aesthetically significant", going in the first year of voting. Roger Ebert added it to his "Great Movies" list.

American Film Institute recognition
 1998 – AFI's 100 Years…100 Movies – No. 23
 2001 – AFI's 100 Years…100 Thrills – No. 26
 2003 – AFI's 100 Years…100 Heroes and Villains:
 Kasper Gutman – Nominated Villain
 Brigid O'Shaughnessy – Nominated Villain
 2005 – AFI's 100 Years…100 Movie Quotes:
 "The stuff that dreams are made of." – No. 14. The expression is based on Act 4 of William Shakespeare’s play The Tempest, wherein Prospero says, "We are such stuff / As dreams are made on".
 "You're good, you're very good." – Nominated
 2007 – AFI's 100 Years…100 Movies (10th Anniversary Edition) – No. 31
 2008 – AFI's 10 Top 10 – No. 6 Mystery Film

See also
 Tribute of the Maltese Falcon

Notes

References

External links

 The Maltese Falcon essay by Richard T. Jameson on the National Film Registry website
 
 
 
 
 
 
 Books about The Maltese Falcon from film.virtual-history.com

Streaming audio
 The Maltese Falcon on Lux Radio Theater: February 8, 1943
 The Maltese Falcon on Screen Guild Theater: September 20, 1943

1941 films
1940s English-language films
1941 crime films
1941 mystery films
American black-and-white films
American crime films
American detective films
American mystery films
Film noir
Films scored by Adolph Deutsch
Films based on American novels
Films based on mystery novels
Films directed by John Huston
Films set in San Francisco
Films with screenplays by John Huston
Treasure hunt films
United States National Film Registry films
Warner Bros. films
Films based on works by Dashiell Hammett
1941 directorial debut films
Remakes of American films
1940s American films